{{DISPLAYTITLE:C23H36O3}}
The molecular formula C23H36O3 may refer to:

 Dihydrotestosterone butyrate
 Drostanolone propionate, an anabolic steroid
 Methandriol propionate
 Propetandrol

Molecular formulas